Julius Nyamu (born 1 December 1977) is a Kenyan middle-distance runner who specializes in the 3000 metres steeplechase.

His personal best time is 8:07.59 minutes, achieved in August 2004 in Brussels.

Achievements

External links

1977 births
Living people
Kenyan male middle-distance runners
Kenyan male steeplechase runners
Kenyan male cross country runners
20th-century Kenyan people